Cleuder Ferreira Assunção Júnior (born 24 June 1981), known as simply Júnior Assunção, is a Brazilian mixed martial artist currently competing in the Lightweight division. A professional competitor since 2004, he has competed for the UFC, the Xtreme Fighting Championships, and King of the Cage.

Biography
Originally from Northeastern Brazil, Junior grew up in Miami, and now resides in Atlanta. He is also the older brother of Raphael Assunção and Freddy Assunção who also fight as mixed martial artists.

Mixed martial arts career
Junior Assuncāo has earned black belts in Brazilian Jiu-Jitsu and Capoeira. His professional MMA career has led to extensive training in these disciplines as well as in Boxing, Judo, Muay Thai, and Wrestling. He has trained out of  Black House (Casa Preta) gym in Brazil with the likes of MMA powerhouses Anderson Silva and Lyoto Machida.

Junior's martial arts foundation is in Capoeira, a Brazilian fight system characterized by acrobatic sweeps, kicks, and head butts that rely heavily on core strength. Having trained under Mestre Delei for 12 years, Junior credits his success in the combat sports to this discipline. As an instructor, Junior incorporates many techniques from Capoeira, such as agility, balance, and practical strength.

Amateur career
Assunção holds an undefeated 2–0 record as an amateur, and made his debut on 17 May 2003, facing Scotty Johnson at ISCF: May Madness in Midtown. He won the fight via second round armbar. In his next amateur fight, Assunção faced Brendan Dumont at Submission Fighting Open 10 on 6 February 2004. He won the fight via guillotine choke, and would officially turn pro in April 2004.

Ultimate Fighting Championship
With a 4–1 record, Assunção signed with the UFC in late 2006. Assunção faced rising star Kurt Pellegrino at UFC 64 on 14 October 2006. He lost the fight via rear-naked choke. In his next fight in the promotion, Assunção faced David Lee at UFC 70 on 21 April 2007. He won the fight via rear-naked choke.

Assunção then faced Nate Diaz at UFC Fight Night 11 on 19 September 2007. He lost the fight via guillotine choke, and was subsequently released from the promotion

Xtreme Fighting Championships
After posting a 4–1 on the regional circuit, Assunção signed with Florida based promotion Xtreme Fighting Championships. He faced John Mahlow for the XFC Lightweight Championship at XFC 10: Night of Champions on 19 March 2010. He won the fight via guillotine choke, and vacated the championship to drop down in weight class and re-sign with the UFC.

Return to UFC
In 2011, Assunção re-signed with the UFC. He faced promotional newcomer Eddie Yagin in a featherweight bout on 24 September 2011 at UFC 135. Assunção went on to win the fight by unanimous decision.

Assunção faced Ross Pearson on 30 December 2011 at UFC 141.  He lost the fight via unanimous decision and was subsequently released from the promotion.

Post-UFC career
Following his second release from UFC, Assunção faced Guilherme Faria for the PFC Featherweight Championship at PFC 2 on 13 September 2013. He won the fight via kimura.

Assunção faced Alejandro Rodriguez at XFC International 5 on 7 June 2014. He won the fight via unanimous decision.

Championships and accomplishments

Mixed martial arts
Xtreme Fighting Championships
XFC Lightweight Championship (One time)
Premium Fight Championship
PFC Featherweight Championship (One time, current)

Mixed martial arts record

|-
| Loss 
| align=center| 16–7
|Arman Tsarukyan
| Decision (unanimous)
| MFP 220: Mayor's Cup 2018
| 
| align=center| 3
| align=center| 5:00
| Khabarovsk, Russia
|Lightweight bout.
|-
| Loss 
| align=center| 16–6
| Adam Townsend
| TKO (knee injury)
| Art of War 18
| 
| align=center| 1
| align=center| 0:49
| Beijing, China
|Welterweight debut.
|-
| Win 
| align=center| 16–5
| Mauricio dos Santos Jr.
| TKO (head kick)
| XFC International 13
| 
| align=center| 2
| align=center| 3:51
| São Paulo, Brazil
| 
|-
| Win 
| align=center| 15–5
| Alejandro Solano Rodriguez 
| Decision (unanimous)
| XFC International 5
| 
| align=center| 5
| align=center| 5:00
| Osasco, São Paulo, Brazil
| 
|-
| Win 
| align=center| 14–5
| Guilherme Faria de Souza 
| Submission (kimura)
| Premium FC 2
| 
| align=center| 4
| align=center| 2:05
| Campinas, São Paulo, Brazil
| 
|-
| Loss
| align=center| 13–5 
| Ross Pearson
| Decision (unanimous)
| UFC 141
| 
| align=center| 3
| align=center| 5:00
| Las Vegas, Nevada, United States
| 
|-
| Win
| align=center| 13–4
| Eddie Yagin
| Decision (unanimous)
| UFC 135
| 
| align=center| 3
| align=center| 5:00
| Denver, Colorado, United States
| 
|-
| Win
| align=center| 12–4
| Wesley Murch
| Submission (rear-naked choke)
| Recife FC 4
| 
| align=center| 1
| align=center| 5:00
| Recife, Brazil
| 
|-
| Win
| align=center| 11–4
| Mark Miller
| KO (punch)
| Recife FC 3
| 
| align=center| 1
| align=center| 4:03
| Recife, Brazil
| 
|-
| Win
| align=center| 10–4
| John Mahlow
| Submission (guillotine choke)
| XFC 10: Night of Champions
| 
| align=center| 1
| align=center| 4:02
| Tampa, Florida, United States
| 
|-
| Win
| align=center| 9–4
| Peter Grimes
| Decision (split)
| ShineFights 2
| 
| align=center| 3
| align=center| 5:00
| Miami, Florida, United States
| 
|-
| Win
| align=center| 8–4
| Kamrin Naville
| Decision (unanimous)
| KOTC: Invincible
| 
| align=center| 3
| align=center| 3:00
| Atlanta, Georgia, United States
| 
|-
| Win
| align=center| 7–4
| Kalvin Hackney
| Decision (unanimous)
| Wild Bill's Fight Night 17
| 
| align=center| 3
| align=center| 5:00
| Atlanta, Georgia, United States
| 
|-
| Loss
| align=center| 6–4
| Torrance Taylor
| Decision (unanimous)
| American Fight League: Bulletproof
| 
| align=center| 3
| align=center| 5:00
| Atlanta, Georgia, United States
| 
|-
| Win
| align=center| 6–3
| Steve Sharp
| Submission (guillotine choke)
| American Fight League: Erupption
| 
| align=center| 3
| align=center| 4:26
| Lexington, Kentucky, United States
| 
|-
| Loss
| align=center| 5–3
| Nate Diaz
| Submission (guillotine choke)
| UFC Fight Night 11
| 
| align=center| 1
| align=center| 4:10
| Las Vegas, Nevada, United States
| 
|-
| Win
| align=center| 5–2
| David Lee
| Submission (rear-naked choke)
| UFC 70
| 
| align=center| 2
| align=center| 1:55
| Manchester, England
| 
|-
| Loss
| align=center| 4–2
| Kurt Pellegrino
| Submission (rear-naked choke)
| UFC 64: Unstoppable
| 
| align=center| 1
| align=center| 2:04
| Las Vegas, Nevada, United States
| 
|-
| Win
| align=center| 4–1
| Scott Hope
| TKO (punches)
| International Sport Combat Federation: Knuckle Up 4
| 
| align=center| 1
| align=center| 1:43
| Kennesaw, Georgia, United States
| 
|-
| Win
| align=center| 3–1
| Dustin Hazelett
| TKO (punches)
| Full Throttle 3
| 
| align=center| 1
| align=center| 4:27
| Georgia, United States
| 
|-
| Win
| align=center| 2–1
| Danny Payne
| Submission (rear-naked choke)
| Full Throttle 2
| 
| align=center| 1
| align=center| 0:50
| Atlanta, Georgia, United States
| 
|-
| Win
| align=center| 1–1
| Will Bradford
| Submission (guillotine choke)
| International Sport Combat Federation: Compound Fracture 2
| 
| align=center| 1
| align=center| 1:55
| Atlanta, Georgia, United States
| 
|-
| Loss
| align=center| 0–1
| Andrew Chappelle
| Decision (unanimous)
| International Sport Combat Federation: Fight Party
| 
| align=center| 3
| align=center| 3:00
| Atlanta, Georgia, United States
|

Amateur mixed martial arts record

|-
|Win
|align=center| 2–0
| Brendan Dumont
| Submission (guillotine choke)
| International Sport Combat Federation: Submission Fighting Open 10
| 
|align=center| 1
|align=center| N/A
|Macon, Georgia, United States
|
|-
|Win
|align=center| 1–0
| Scotty Johnson
| Submission (armbar)
| International Sport Combat Federation: May Madness 
| 
|align=center|2
|align=center|N/A
|Atlanta, Georgia, United States
|

References

External links
 
 

1981 births
Living people
Brazilian male mixed martial artists
Brazilian practitioners of Brazilian jiu-jitsu
Brazilian capoeira practitioners
Brazilian emigrants to the United States
Featherweight mixed martial artists
Lightweight mixed martial artists
Mixed martial artists utilizing capoeira
Mixed martial artists utilizing Brazilian jiu-jitsu
People awarded a black belt in Brazilian jiu-jitsu
Sportspeople from Recife
Ultimate Fighting Championship male fighters